Lamine Gueye may refer to:

 Amadou Lamine-Guèye (1891–1968), Senegalese politician
 Lamine Guèye (skier) (born 1960), Senegalese skier
 Lamine Gueye (footballer) (born 1998), Senegalese footballer
 Stade Lamine Guèye, multi-use stadium in Kaolack, Senegal

See also
 Lamine-Gueye Koné (born 1989), Ivorian footballer